Roger Arliner Young (1899 – November 9, 1964) was an American scientist of zoology, biology, and marine biology. She was the first African American woman to receive a doctorate degree in zoology.

Early years
Born in Clifton Forge, Virginia  in 1899, Young soon moved with her family to Burgettstown, Pennsylvania. The family was poor and most of the time resources were expended in the care of her disabled mother.

In 1916, Young enrolled at Howard University in Washington, D.C. to study music. She wrote in the yearbook: "Not failure, but low aim is a crime." She did not take her first science course until 1921. Though her grades were poor at the beginning of her college career, some of her teachers saw promise in her. One such teacher was Ernest Everett Just, a prominent black biologist and head of the Zoology department at Howard University. Young graduated with a bachelor's degree in 1923.  Just tried unsuccessfully to help her to gain funding for graduate school, but in 1924 Young began studying for her master's degree at the University of Chicago, which she received in 1926.

Young worked with Ernest Everett Just for many years, teaching as an assistant professor at Howard University, from 1923 to 1935. Research was done during the summers. Young assisted Just in his research from 1927 through 1930, but although her assistance was noted in his grant applications, her name does not appear as a coauthor in the resulting publications.

While studying at Chicago, she was asked to join Sigma Xi, a scientific research society, which was an unusual honor for a master's student. In 1924 her first article, "On the excretory apparatus in Paramecium" was published in the journal Science, making her the first African American woman to obtain a professional publication on original research in this field.

Career
Ernest Everett Just invited Young to work with him during summers at the Marine Biological Laboratory in Woods Hole, Massachusetts beginning in 1927.
During their time in Woods Hole, Just and Young worked on researching the fertilization process in marine organisms, as well as the process of hydration and dehydration in living cells. In 1929, Young became interim department head for the zoology department at Howard University during the time that Just had travelled to Europe seeking grant money. Young's eyes were permanently damaged by the ultraviolet rays used in the experiments conducted at Howard for Just.

In the fall of 1930, Young returned to the University of Chicago to begin her doctorate degree under the direction of Frank Rattray Lillie. Lillie had been a mentor of Just while both were involved with the Marine Biological Laboratory. However, in 1930 she failed to pass her qualifying exams, and for a time, disappeared from the scientific community. She returned to Howard University to teach and continued working with Just at the Marine Biological Laboratory during the summers.

However, around 1934, rumors started circulating that there was a romance between Just and Young, and in 1936 they had a huge confrontation. Later that year she was fired, ostensibly because she missed classes. In her words, "The situation here is so cruel and cowardly that every spark of sentiment that I have held for Howard is cold." She used this setback as an opportunity to try again to obtain a Ph.D. In June 1937, she went to the University of Pennsylvania, studying with Lewis Victor Heilbrunn (another scientist she met at the Marine Biological Laboratory) and graduated with her doctorate in 1940.

After obtaining her doctorate, Young became an assistant professor at the North Carolina College for Negroes and Shaw University (1940–1947), and held teaching positions in Texas, Mississippi and Louisiana until 1959.

Young contributed a great deal of work to science. She studied the effects of direct and indirect radiation on sea urchin eggs, on the structures that control the salt concentration in paramecium, as well as hydration and dehydration of living cells.

Personal life
Young unfortunately never married and in addition to the occupation-related damage to her eyes, she had financial struggles, and was the sole support for her ill mother, Lillie Young, until she died. Away from Howard, her options as an African-American woman scientist were limited to teaching positions without access to research facilities and support. In the 1950s, she hospitalized herself for mental health problems. Roger Arliner Young died on November 9, 1964 in New Orleans, Louisiana.

Honors
Roger Arliner Young was recognized in 1879 in a Congressional Resolution along with four other African American women "who have broken through many barriers to achieve greatness in science." The others honored were Ruth Ella Moore ("who in 1933 became the first African American woman to earn a Ph.D. in natural science from the Ohio State University"), Euphemia Lofton Haynes ("who in 1943 became the first African American woman to receive a Ph.D. in mathematics from the Catholic University of America"), Shirley Ann Jackson ("who in 1973 became the first African American woman to receive a Ph.D. in physics from the Massachusetts Institute of Technology"), and Mae Jemison ("a physician and the first African American woman in space").

A group of environmental and conservation groups established the Roger Arliner Young (RAY) Marine Conservation Diversity Fellowship in Young's honor, to support young African Americans who want to become involved in marine environmental conservation work.

Works

See also
 List of Howard University people
 Ruth Ella Moore, the first black woman in the United States to receive a doctoral degree in bacteriology (in 1933, from Ohio State University)

References

 Roger Arliner Young, a brief bio from Infoplease.
 Black Biography: Roger Arliner Young from Answers.com.
 
 Roger Arliner Young, Scientist, by Kenneth R. Manning for Sage: A Scholarly Journal of Black Women, 6: 3-7, 1989.
 Black Stars: African American Women Scientists and Inventors, by Otha Richard Sullivan, Jossey-Bass Publishers, 2001.

African-American scientists
Women zoologists
1890s births
1964 deaths
African-American women scientists
Howard University alumni
University of Chicago alumni
Howard University faculty
University of Pennsylvania alumni
North Carolina Central University faculty
Shaw University faculty
People from Clifton Forge, Virginia
Scientists from Virginia
20th-century American zoologists
20th-century American women scientists
People from Washington County, Pennsylvania
Scientists from Pennsylvania
Women marine biologists